Lise Thomsen (26 December 1914 – 26 November 2003) was a Danish film actress. She appeared in 38 films between 1938 and 1977. She was born in Florida and died in Denmark.

Filmography

 Terror (1977)
 Nøddebo Præstegård (1974)
 Sankt Hansaften-spil] (1972)
 Daddy, Darling (1970)
 Ved du hvad du skulle? Gifte dig med Tulle! (1970)
 Midt i en jazztid (1969)
 Dyrlægens plejebørn (1968)
 Mig og min lillebror og storsmuglerne (1968)
 Jag en kvinna, II - äktenskapet (1968)
 Mig og min lillebror (1967)
 Min kones ferie (1967)
 Bukserne (1967)
 Jeg - en marki (1967)
 I stykker (1966)
 Jag - en älskare (1966)
 Dyden går amok (1966)
 Mor bag rattet (1965)
 Jensen længe leve (1965)
 Landmandsliv (1965)
 Alt for kvinden (1964)
 Støv for alle pengene (1963)
 Den hvide hingst (1961)
 Krudt og klunker (1958)
 Sønnen fra Amerika (1957)
 Nålen (1951)
 Unge piger forsvinder i København (1951)
 Hvor er far? (1948)
 Lise kommer til Byen (1947)
 Jeg elsker en anden (1946)
 Diskret Ophold (1946)
 Billet mrk. (1946)
 Afsporet (1942)
 Gå med mig hjem (1941)
 Wienerbarnet (1941)
 En forbryder (1941)
 I de gode, gamle dage (1940)
 I dag begynder livet (1939)
 Blaavand melder Storm (1938)

References

External links

1914 births
2003 deaths
Danish film actresses